Trachypepla lichenodes is a moth of the family Oecophoridae first described by Edward Meyrick in 1883. It is endemic to New Zealand and has been found in both the North and South Islands. It inhabits native forest and adults of this species are on the wing from November to January. The adult moths are similarly coloured to native lichen species however this colouration is variable in the extent and depth on the  forewings.

Taxonomy
This species was first described by Edward Meyrick in 1883. A fuller description of this species was given by Meyrick in 1884. The male genitalia of this species was studied and illustrated by Alfred Philpott in 1927. George Hudson discussed and illustrated this species in his 1928 book The butterflies and moths of New Zealand. The female holotype, collected at the Bealey River in North Canterbury is held at the Natural History Museum, London.

Description 

Meyrick described this species as follows:

The yellow markings found on the forewings of adults of this species are variable in both their extent and depth of colour. The yellow and black colouration of this moth mimics lichens and as a result ensures the moth is well camouflaged when resting on these lichens.

Distribution 
This species is endemic to New Zealand. It has been found in both the North and South Islands, including in Wellington, Nelson, Lake Rotoiti, Puhi Puhi, Castle Hill, North Canterbury, Mount Cook, Waiho Gorge, Longwood Range, in the Te Anau District and on the Bealey and Ōtira rivers. This species is regarded as being "not generally common".

Habitat
This species inhabits native forests.

Behaviour
The adults of this species are on the wing from November to January.

References 

Moths described in 1883
Oecophoridae
Taxa named by Edward Meyrick
Moths of New Zealand
Endemic fauna of New Zealand
Endemic moths of New Zealand